Sadio Sow (born March 13, 1976) is a Senegalese association football player who currently plays as a winger for Cherbourg.

External links
Sadio Sow profile at chamoisfc79.fr

1976 births
Living people
Senegalese footballers
Association football wingers
FC Nantes players
Gazélec Ajaccio players
Chamois Niortais F.C. players
AS Nancy Lorraine players
Preston North End F.C. players
US Créteil-Lusitanos players
Nîmes Olympique players
AS Cherbourg Football players
RC Strasbourg Alsace players
Ligue 2 players
Expatriate footballers in Morocco
English Football League players
Kawkab Marrakech players